This article lists fellows of the Royal Society elected in 1965.

Fellows 

Robert Edward Bell
George Douglas Hutton Bell
Sydney Brenner
Giles Skey Brindley
Bertram Neville Brockhouse
Arthur Roderick Collar
Sir Edward Foyle Collingwood
Robert Royston Amos Coombs
Kenneth George Denbigh
Gordon Elliott Fogg
Charles Edmund Ford
Roderic Alfred Gregory
Dorothy Hill
Alan Woodworth Johnson
Reginald Victor Jones
Charles Kemball
John Stodart Kennedy
Tom Kilburn
Sir Hans Leo Kornberg
Hans Kronberger
Charles Philippe Leblond
Panchanan Maheshwari
Sir Basil John Mason
William Valentine Mayneord
Sir Robert Gordon Menzies
Sir Gilbert Roberts
Stanley Keith Runcorn
Philip MacDonald Sheppard
Keith Stewartson
John Marion Thoday
John Clive Ward
Gerald Beresford Whitham
Sir Geoffrey Wilkinson

Foreign Members

Theodosius Dobzhansky
Richard Feynman
Jaroslav Heyrovsky
Severo Ochoa

References

1965
1965 in science
1965 in the United Kingdom